Elio Esteban Ibarra Carmona (born October 30, 1967) is a retired boxer from Argentina. He won a bronze medal in the Men's Super Heavyweight (+ 91 kg) division at the 1991 Pan American Games. Ibarra represented his native South American country at the 1992 Summer Olympics, where he was defeated in the first round.

References
sports-reference

1967 births
Living people
Heavyweight boxers
Olympic boxers of Argentina
Boxers at the 1991 Pan American Games
Boxers at the 1992 Summer Olympics
Argentine male boxers
Pan American Games bronze medalists for Argentina
Pan American Games medalists in boxing
Medalists at the 1991 Pan American Games